John A. Cameron (March 28, 1886 – November 17, 1953) was a Canadian athlete who competed in the 1920 Summer Olympics. He was born in Scotland. In 1920 he participated in the Olympic hammer throw event but was unable to set a mark. At the 1930 Empire Games he won the bronze medal in the hammer throw competition. He also competed in the shot put competition.

References

External links
sports-reference.com

1886 births
1953 deaths
Athletes from Vancouver
Canadian male hammer throwers
Canadian male shot putters
Olympic track and field athletes of Canada
Athletes (track and field) at the 1920 Summer Olympics
Athletes (track and field) at the 1930 British Empire Games
Commonwealth Games bronze medallists for Canada
Commonwealth Games medallists in athletics
20th-century Canadian people
Medallists at the 1930 British Empire Games